Mariana Valeria Larroquette (born 24 October 1992) is an Argentine professional footballer who plays as a right-back or a winger for Liga MX Femenil side Club León and the Argentina national team.

International career
Larroquette represented Argentina at the 2008 FIFA U-20 Women's World Cup and the 2012 FIFA U-20 Women's World Cup. At senior level, she played at two Copa América Femenina editions (2014 and 2018), scoring three goals at the first and two at the latter, as well as the 2015 Pan American Games and the 2019 FIFA Women's World Cup.

International goals
Scores and results list Argentina's goal tally first

Personal life
Larroquette is a supporter of Racing.

References
Notes

Citations

External links 
 
 
 
 

1992 births
Living people
People from Ituzaingó Partido
Sportspeople from Buenos Aires Province
Argentine women's footballers
Women's association football forwards
Club Atlético River Plate (women) players
Universidad de Chile footballers
UAI Urquiza (women) players
Lyn Fotball Damer players
Kansas City Current players
Club León (women) footballers
Toppserien players
National Women's Soccer League players
Argentina women's youth international footballers
Argentina women's international footballers
Competitors at the 2014 South American Games
South American Games medalists in football
South American Games gold medalists for Argentina
Footballers at the 2015 Pan American Games
2019 FIFA Women's World Cup players
Footballers at the 2019 Pan American Games
Medalists at the 2019 Pan American Games
Pan American Games medalists in football
Pan American Games silver medalists for Argentina
Argentine expatriate women's footballers
Argentine expatriate sportspeople in Chile
Expatriate women's footballers in Chile
Argentine expatriate sportspeople in Norway
Expatriate women's footballers in Norway
Argentine expatriate sportspeople in the United States
Expatriate women's soccer players in the United States
Argentine expatriate sportspeople in Portugal
Expatriate women's footballers in Portugal
Argentine expatriate sportspeople in Mexico
Expatriate women's footballers in Mexico